This is a list of the royal consorts of Georgia from –20 February 1810.

Queen consort of the Kingdom of Iberia (302 BC–580)

Queen consort of the Principality of Iberia (580–1008)

Queen consort or King consort of the Kingdom of Georgia (1008–1490)

Georgia split into three independent kingdoms by 1490. The Kings of Kartli were descendants of Constantine II, the Kings of Kakheti from George VIII and the Kings of Imereti from Bagrat VI.

Queen consort of the Kingdom of Kartli (1484–1762)

Upon Teimuraz II's death, Kartli and Kakheti were united once more with the exception of Imereti.

Queen consort of the Kingdom of Kakheti (1490–1762)

Upon Teimuraz II's death, Kartli and Kakheti were united once more with the exception of Imereti.

Queen consort of the Kingdom of Kartli-Kakheti (1762–1801)
In 1762, the Kingdom of Kartli and the Kingdom of Kakheti were united under one ruler.

Annexation of Kakheti and Kartli to Russia by Paul I of Russia, 1801.

Queen consort of the Kingdom of Imereti (1490–1810)
Although a vassal kingdom of Imereti was created in 1258, the only queens consort mentioned by names were Theodora Palaiologina, the former Queen of All Georgia, and Ana Orbeliani, wife of Alexander I of Imereti, who was really a Duke of Shorapani and not a king.

Annexation of Imereti to Russia by Alexander I of Russia, 20 February 1810.

Gallery

References

Lists of queens
Queens consort from Georgia (country)
Georgian
consorts